Buchinak-e Jadid (also Romanized as Būchīnak-e Jadīd; also known as Būchīnak, Bechīnak, Bichang, and Bichnak) is a village in Ilat-e Qaqazan-e Sharqi Rural District, Kuhin District, Qazvin County, Qazvin Province, Iran. At the 2006 census, its population was 95, in 27 families.

References 

Populated places in Qazvin County